The Free Bolivia Movement (Spanish: Movimiento Bolivia Libre) is a progressive political party in Bolivia. The party was formed on January 15, 1985, following a split in MIR. Initially the party was known as MIR Bolivia Libre.
At the legislative elections in 2002, the party won in alliance with the Nationalist Revolutionary Movement 26.9% of the popular vote and 36 out of 130 seats in the Chamber of Deputies and 11 out of 27 seats in the Senate.

External links
Official web site

1985 establishments in Bolivia
Political parties established in 1985
Political parties in Bolivia
Progressive parties in Bolivia
Revolutionary Nationalist Movement breakaway groups